The 2013 Denham Hospitality Summer Classic was held from September 6 to 8 at the Leduc Curling Club in Leduc, Alberta as part of the 2013–14 World Curling Tour. Both the men's and women's events were held in a round robin format. The purse for both the men's and the women's events were CAD$9,100 each.

Men

Teams

The teams are listed as follows:

Knockout results
The draw is listed as follows:

A event

B event

C event

Playoffs
The playoffs draw is listed as follows:

Women
The teams are listed as follows:

Teams

Knockout results
The draw is listed as follows:

A event

B event

C event

Playoffs
The playoffs draw is listed as follows:

References

External links

2013 in Canadian curling
Leduc, Alberta